Justice Lyons may refer to:

Champ Lyons, associate justice of the Supreme Court of Alabama
Henry A. Lyons, chief justice of the Supreme Court California
Peter Lyons (Virginia judge), associate justice of the Virginia Supreme Court

See also
Justice Lyon (disambiguation)